Cleomella arborea syn. Peritoma arborea (formerly Isomeris arborea, syn. Cleome isomeris), is a perennial shrub or bush in the spiderflower family (Cleomaceae) known by the common names bladderpod, bladderpod spiderflower and burro-fat. It has yellow flowers in bloom all months of the year. It emits a foul odor to discourage herbivory from insects.

Range and habitat
It is native to California and Baja California Peninsula where it grows in a variety of habitats usually described as desert or brush.

Description
The plant produces abundant inflorescences at the ends of the stem branches much of the year. The four sepals are fused about halfway from their base. It is smooth and green when new, aging to light brown.

A typical inflorescence bears a number of flower buds at its tip, open flowers proximal to the buds, and maturing fruits which have shed their flowers below these.

In the previous genus name, "Iso" means "equal", and "meris" means "part", referring to the stamens being of equal length.

References

External links

Photo gallery

Cleomaceae
Flora of the California desert regions
Flora of Baja California
Flora of the Sonoran Deserts
Flora of California
Flora without expected TNC conservation status